Zynga with Friends (formerly Newtoy, Inc.) was a video game developer founded in 2008 by brothers Paul Bettner and David Bettner, and their cousin Michael Chow. In November 2008, Newtoy, Inc. released its first game for the iPhone and iPod touch, Chess with Friends, an asynchronous multiplayer game released for the Apple App Store. In August the following year, it released its second game for iPhone and iPod touch, Words with Friends, another asynchronous multiplayer game with gameplay similar to Scrabble, which ultimately became their best known game. In November 2010, the company was acquired by Zynga for $53.3 million and an undisclosed amount of stock. Following the acquisition, the studio would be rebranded to Zynga with Friends in December of that year. Newtoy would be the company's fourteenth acquisition within its peak years.

Nearly two years since the studio's latest release, Zynga with Friends would release the company's third title, Hanging with Friends, on June 9, 2011, the title would be followed by Scramble with Friends in January 2012. The company was attempting to capitalize on the breakthrough success of Words with Friends, Zynga re-launched Zynga with Friends as a standalone social network in June 2012. Within the autumn of that year, it was clear that the Zynga with Friends social network was no longer a success; the Bettner brothers left the company, with Zynga's stock price beginning to decline.

Games

References

External links
 Official Website

Video game companies of the United States
Video game companies established in 2008
Zynga
Companies based in McKinney, Texas